Lalmonirhat Government College is an institution of higher education in Bangladesh. It is located in Lalmonirhat Sadar Upazila.

History

Lalmonirhat College was established on 1 July 1964. Renting a single tin shade room from current Lalmonirhat Govt Girls High School (before non-govt) the journey of the college begun. Later in the year 1971, Lalmonirhat College was shifted to a new premises (current). On 1 November 1984 the college earned nationalization.

Currently about 2000 HSC, Honors, and Masters level students are enrolled in the college in regular and irregular session, 450 of them being HSC students. Number of teachers is more than 30. There are three main branches of study in this college: science, arts and commerce.

References

Educational institutions established in 1963
1963 establishments in East Pakistan